The Mayor of Sylhet is the chief executive of the Sylhet City Corporation. The Mayor's office administers all city services, public property, most public agencies, and enforces all city and state laws within Sylhet city.

The Mayor's office is located in Nagar Bhaban; it has jurisdiction over all 27 wards of Sylhet City..

List of officeholders 
Political parties

Elections

Election Result 2018

Election Result 2013

References 

 
Sylhet City Corporation
Sylhet
People from Sylhet District